Shu'ayb bin Salih (Persian: شعیب بن صالح) or Saleh-ibn-Shu'ayb (or Shu'aib ibn Salih) is a/the individual who is considered amongst the personalities who will make uprising before al-Mahdi's reappearance, and his uprising is pondered among the signs of the reappearance of the twelfth/last Imam of Shia Islam, al-Mahdi; according to some Islamic narrations.

Characteristics 
According to Islamic narrations,  Shu'ayb ibn Salih has been described as "a light-brown-skin young man with a low beard; and is regarded from Banu-Tamim or one of their servants. Shu'ayb's soldiers number is said to be 4,000, and he is described as the commander of a (Khorasani) individual resurrection who is from Banu Hashim.

Uprising 
According to hadiths, the commencement of the uprising (from Khorasan) will be led by Shu'aib ibn Salih. The uprising of him is pondered to be run from Rey, Samarkand, Nishapur, or Taleqan. It has also mentioned that: Shu'aib ibn Salih's soldiers hold black flags, wearing black cummerbunds and white dresses. As well as this, they will fight against Sufyani, and will overcome his army, afterwards they will move towards Bayt-al-Moqaddas (Jerusalem); and will provide the rule for al-Mahdi.

Based on hadiths, the period of time between Shu'ayib ibn Salih's resurrection and al-Mahdi reappearance is 72 months; and Shu'ayb ibn Salih's uprising is going to be after Awf-al-Silmi's uprising and likewise before Sufyani's insurrection.

Seyyed Khorasani 
Shu'ayb ibn Salih has been narrated in (most of) the hadiths that will be from the city of Rey, and it has been mentioned that he will be with Seyyed Khorasani who has the politic leadership of Iranians. According to narrations, they are going to give to the flag of Islam to al-Mahdi. Likewise, they will participate with their forces in al-Mahdi's movement. Khorasani and Shu'aib will be settled among the specific companions of al-Mahdi, and Shu'aib ibn Salih will be appointed as the commander of all al-Mahdi's forces.

See also 

 Mahdi
 Sufyani
 The Occultation
 Khasf al-Bayda'
 Seyed Khorasani
 Al-Yamani (Shiism)
 The voice from sky
 Reappearance of al-Mahdi
 Nafs-e-Zakiyyah (Pure soul)
 Signs of the reappearance of al-Mahdi

References 

Shia eschatology
Shia imams
Religious leadership roles
Islamic terminology
Shia Islam
Islamic eschatology
Mahdism